Rheinheimera pacifica is a Gram-negative, rod-shaped, aerobic, halotolerant and motile bacterium from the genus of Rheinheimera which has been isolated from deep sea water from the Pacific.

References 

Chromatiales
Bacteria described in 2003